The Purge: Anarchy is a 2014 American dystopian action horror film written and directed by James DeMonaco. A sequel to 2013's The Purge and the second installment in the Purge franchise, the film stars Frank Grillo, Carmen Ejogo, Zach Gilford, Kiele Sanchez, and Michael K. Williams. Edwin Hodge reprised his role from the first film. It was released worldwide on July 18, 2014.

The film grossed over $111 million and received mixed reviews from critics, who praised it as an improvement over its predecessor, but criticized its clichéd formula and screenplay. While the first film was set largely in one house, Anarchy takes place around the Greater Los Angeles area and shows more of what happens to the surroundings during the event. A third film in the series, The Purge: Election Year, was released on July 1, 2016.

Plot

In a dystopian United States, ruled by a totalitarian government known as the New Founding Fathers of America (NFFA), the annual Purge, a 12-hour event that legalizes all crimes without authorities intervening, is credited as having saved the country's collapsing economy. While everyone across the United States prepares for the carnage, the nation's impoverished population is no longer seen as people, but as living garbage, whom the wealthy denounce as only living to serve their needs. However, before the sixth annual Purge begins on March 21, 2023, a successful anti-Purge resistance group led by Carmelo Johns and his partner, the Stranger from the first film, hijack government feeds to denounce the New Founding Fathers and their actions.

In Los Angeles, working-class waitress Eva Sanchez returns home to her 17-year-old daughter Cali and terminally ill father Rico, who also despise the New Founding Fathers. As Eva and Cali prepare to barricade themselves into their apartment, Rico retires to his room to be alone as the Purge starts. As the Purge alarm sounds, Rico slips out to a waiting limousine, leaving a note for his family revealing that he has sold himself as a Purge offering to a rich family in exchange for $100,000 to be paid to Eva and Cali after the Purge. Eva and Cali are distraught by this situation.

Estranged married couple Shane and Liz visit a grocery store, only to be harassed by a masked gang of bikers. As they drive away to avoid them, their car breaks down; the biker gang had cut their fuel line. Meanwhile, an off-duty Los Angeles Police Department sergeant, Leo Barnes, plots to kill Warren Grass. Grass had inadvertently run down and killed Barnes's son, Nicholas, while driving drunk the day before the previous year's Purge; Grass was acquitted of the crime on a legal technicality due to Nicholas having died of his injuries on Purge night. Despite pleas from his ex-wife Janice to abandon his plans, Barnes drives out into the streets with an armored car and several weapons, posing as a vigilante.

As Shane and Liz try to find a safe hiding place, the Purge commences. Eva and Cali notice NFFA paramilitary amassing in the street below, and they hear a bang, and Eva asks are they in the apartment and chided by Cali that they have not entered the building, it turns out to be intruding superintendent Diego, who's enraged by Eva and now intends to assault her. Diego is gunned down by a paramilitary platoon, which captures the women to offer them to their leader, Big Daddy, for his own personal purge. Leo passes by the scene and rescues Eva and Cali after killing the troops and wounding Big Daddy. They find Shane and Liz hiding in Leo's car. The group flees just as Big Daddy fires at them, damaging the vehicle. After Leo's car breaks down, the group flees on foot, and Eva promises Leo a new car from her co-worker, Tanya, in exchange for Leo’s protection.

As the group navigates the hostile streets, they find evidence that the anti-Purge group has been gaining the upper hand against the Purgers, discovering a paramilitary van surrounded by soldiers who were shot to death by the resistance fighters. After freeing Shane from a trap and taking guns from the abandoned truck, they head to the subways. Chaos ensues when a pyrotechnic Purging gang invades the subways and sets the tunnel ablaze. Shane is wounded, but the group manages to escape after he and Liz destroy the gang's all-terrain vehicle and its propane tank with the salvaged submachine guns, killing the entire gang.

The group returns to the streets, but as they near Tanya's apartment building, Eva unknowingly signals a traffic camera to identify them to the paramilitary troops who pick up the apartment's location. They reach Tanya's house, where Eva confesses she lied to Leo about the car, as her co-worker does not have one. Tanya's family takes them in, offering dinner and medicine. However, Tanya's sister Lorraine proceeds to murder her sister for sleeping with her husband. The group leaves the family to their fate, only to be captured by the masked gang who ambushed Shane and Liz earlier. This gang reveals that they had no intention to kill the group and are selling them off to an auction, taking them to a theater where upper-class Purgers bid on them for human hunting. After the group is forced into the arena, Leo subdues and kills a Purger, taking his weapon and night-vision glasses, using the devices to overpower and kill several other attackers, and providing their arms to Shane and the others before the head Purger calls in security to suppress the uprising. Shane is shot and killed by security forces. As Liz mourns Shane’s death, the anti-Purge group attacks the compound, killing the security forces and remaining Purgers; Liz chooses to stay with the resistance fighters to retaliate against Shane's murderers, while Leo, Eva and Cali leave. Leo carjacks the auctioneer, holding her at gunpoint and threatening her before leaving in her car.

Leo, Eva, and Cali drive up to a suburban neighborhood and stop at the home of Warren Grass at 6:55 A.M, five minutes before the end of the purge. After telling the story of his son's death, he ventures into the house despite Eva and Cali's pleas, threatening Warren and his wife. Later, Leo exits the house covered in blood, only to be shot by Big Daddy, who reveals that the New Founding Fathers have secretly dispatched death squads to increase the body count because the purge eliminates too few of the lower class, due to most of the Purgers murdering those they have personal grudges against and not just random people, which was the NFFA's original intentions when the Purge was conceived. Just as Big Daddy is about to kill Leo, Warren appears and kills Big Daddy with a single shot from a handgun, revealing that Leo chose to forgive and spare him. As Big Daddy's death squad appears while Eva, Cali, and Warren prepare to defend themselves, sirens blare to signal the end of the purge (making Big Daddy's death legal and sparing Leo). Warren drives Eva, Cali, and Leo to the hospital as news and police helicopters fly over the city.

It is shown that it is 7:09 on the morning of March 22 and that there are 364 days until the next purge.

Cast

 Frank Grillo as Leo Barnes (credited as the "Sergeant"), an off duty LAPD Police Sergeant who goes out on Purge Night to find Warren Grass so he can avenge his son's death.
 Carmen Ejogo as Eva Sanchez, a waitress
 Zach Gilford as Shane, estranged husband of Liz
 Kiele Sanchez as Liz, estranged wife of Shane
 Zoë Soul as Cali Sanchez, Eva's 17-year old daughter
 Justina Machado as Tanya, friend of Eva and co-worker
 John Beasley as Papa Rico Sanchez, father of Eva and Cali's grandfather
 Jack Conley as Big Daddy, leader of a Death Squad
 Noel G. as Diego, an obsessed building caretaker at Eva and Cali's residence
 Castulo Guerra as Barney, father of Tanya and Lorraine
 Michael K. Williams as Carmelo Johns, leader of an Anti-Purge group
 Edwin Hodge as Dante Bishop (credited as "The Stranger"), member of an Anti-Purge group
 Lakeith Stanfield as Young Ghoul Face, leader of a purger gang
 Roberta Valderrama as Lorraine, sister of Tanya and wife of Roddy
 Niko Nicotera as Roddy, Tanya's brother-in-law who she has secret affairs with
 Bel Hernandez as Katherine, Tanya and Lorraine's mother
 Lily Knight as Mrs. Crawley, Eva and Tanya's employer
 Brandon Keener as Warren Grass, the person responsible for killing Leo's son while drunk driving
 Amy Price-Francis as Mrs. Grass, Warren's wife
 Vick Sabitjian as Mr. Sabian, a frequent customer in Eva's workplace
 Nicholas Gonzalez as Carlos, co-worker of Eva and Tanya
 Chad Morgan as Janice, Leo's ex-wife
 Judith McConnell as Old Elegant Woman, hostess of an elite Purge game
 Dale Dye as New Founding Father Donald Talbot
 Cindy Robinson as the Purge Emergency Broadcast System announcement voice (uncredited)

Tyler Osterkamp	and Nathan Clarkson reprise their roles as Freak Purgers from The Purge in an uncredited capacity, while archive footage of Ethan Hawke, Rhys Wakefield, and Alicia Vela-Bailey as James Sandin, Polite Leader and the Blonde Female Freak Purger from The Purge is also shown over the end credits.

Production
On June 10, 2013, Universal Pictures and Jason Blum announced the development of the sequel, after the success of The Purge. Initially a release date was set for June 20, 2014, although this was later pushed back to July 18. Principal photography was underway in Los Angeles when Blumhouse Productions released their countdown promo art on January 1, 2014. Filming wrapped on February 10, 2014.

Home media
The Purge: Anarchy was released on Blu-ray, DVD, and Digital on October 21, 2014. The film was released on 4K UHD Blu-Ray on June 12, 2018.

Reception

Box office
The Purge: Anarchy grossed $72 million in America and $40 million in other countries for a total gross of $111.9 million, against a budget of $9 million.

The film was released in North America in 3,303 theaters, and earned $2.6 million in its first night. In its opening weekend, the film grossed $29.8 million, finishing in second place behind the continued run of Dawn of the Planet of the Apes. This was about $4 million less than the opening of the original film ($34 million).

Critical response
On review aggregator website Rotten Tomatoes, the film has an approval rating of 57% based on 143 reviews, with an average rating of 5.40/10. The website's critics consensus reads, "Gritty, grisly, and uncommonly ambitious, The Purge: Anarchy represents a slight improvement over its predecessor, but it's still never as smart or resonant as it tries to be." On Metacritic, the film has a weighted average score 50 out of 100, based on 32 critics, indicating "mixed or average reviews". Audiences polled by CinemaScore gave the film an average grade of "B" on an A+ to F scale.

Sequel
A third film in the series titled The Purge: Election Year was released on July 1, 2016.

Legacy
The film was the theme for a scare zone in the 2014 edition of Halloween Horror Nights at two of the Universal Parks & Resorts. It was also a house at Halloween Horror Nights the following year in Orlando while Hollywood received a scare zone and being the main theme of Terror Tram.

References

External links
 
 
 
 
 

2014 films
2014 action thriller films
2014 crime thriller films
2014 horror thriller films
2014 science fiction films
2010s action horror films
2014 science fiction action films
2010s science fiction horror films
2010s science fiction thriller films
American action horror films
American action thriller films
American crime thriller films
American horror thriller films
American science fiction action films
American science fiction horror films
American science fiction thriller films
American sequel films
Crime horror films
American dystopian films
Films directed by James DeMonaco
Films produced by Andrew Form
Films produced by Bradley Fuller
Films produced by Jason Blum
Films produced by Michael Bay
Films set in 2023
Films set in the future
Films set in Los Angeles
Films shot in Los Angeles
Films with screenplays by James DeMonaco
Platinum Dunes films
Blumhouse Productions films
Urban survival films
Anarchy
Social science fiction films
2010s English-language films
2010s American films